Marilyn Moore is an American contemporary basketmaker.

Moore has shown her work in galleries throughout the country since 1994, including sculpture and functional art in New York City and Chicago, the del Mano Gallery Los Angeles, the Fountainhead Gallery Seattle and the Smithsonian in Washington DC.

In 1997 she received a Bachelor of Fine Arts with an emphasis on fiber arts at the University of Washington, and has contributed to books on basketmaking and textile techniques including Metal, for Jewelers Textile Artists & Sculptors by Arline Fisch, and Baskets Tradition and Beyond by Leier, Peters and Wallace.

Moore has produced instructional CDs, particularly Pine Needle Basket Making and Introduction to Coiling, with Katherine Thomas. Her work consists of brightly colored wire baskets in organic shapes, developed from simple woven pine needle baskets.

Photographs of her work have been published in the Seattle Times Pacific Magazine and other arts and craft magazines. Kevin Wallace's article, "Marilyn Moore Basketmaker", in Shuttle, Spindle and Dyepot magazine illustrated her work and methods.

References

External links
 

American artists
Living people
Year of birth missing (living people)